Samayanallur was a state assembly constituency in Madurai district in Tamil Nadu. It is a Scheduled Caste reserved constituency. Elections and Winners from this constituency are listed below.

Madras State

Tamil Nadu

Election results

2006

2001

1996

1991

1989

1984

1980

1977

References

External links
 

Former assembly constituencies of Tamil Nadu
Madurai district